Magnay is a surname. Notable people with the surname include:

Carl Magnay
Christopher Magnay (1767–1826), Lord Mayor of London in 1821 
Claude Magnay (1819–1870), English clergyman, writer and cricketer
Thomas Magnay
William Magnay (disambiguation)

Surnames of Norman origin